Mary Brown is an American singer-songwriter best known for co-writing Destiny's Child "No, No, No", as well as Jaheim's "Fabulous". Brown was originally a member of girl-group trio Abstrac, signed to Reprise Records in the 1980s,  which evolved into new jack swing duo M&M signed to Atlantic Records in 1990 as a result of shifting group membership. Both iterations of the group were able to release albums: An eponymous trio album in 1989 for Reprise, and a 1992 M&M album Get To Know Ya Betta on Atlantic. Brown moved into songwriting and background vocals when the group dissolved in 1992.

Songwriting and production credits
Credits are courtesy of Discogs, Tidal, Apple Music, and AllMusic.

Background vocals

Guest appearances

Awards and nominations

References 

African-American songwriters
American rhythm and blues singer-songwriters
Living people
Year of birth missing (living people)